Charlotte's Quest Nature Center is a nature center in Manchester, Maryland. It is operated by the Manchester Parks Foundation and is adjacent to Pine Valley Park and Manchester Elementary School.

History
Charlotte's Quest Nature Center was opened on May 3, 1995 as Charlotte's Quest for the Outside World. It was named after Charlotte Collett, a retired teacher who had the vision of opening the facility.

In 2001, following Collett's passing, the town of Manchester voted unanimously to name the center in honor of her.

References

External links

Official site

1995 establishments in Maryland
Manchester, Maryland
Nature centers in Maryland
Museums in Carroll County, Maryland
Protected areas of Carroll County, Maryland